Baroness Gratia Maria Margretha, Baroness Schimmelpenninck van der Oye (10 July 1912 – 12 February 2012) was a Dutch alpine skier. Her father was president of the Dutch National Olympic Committee during the 1928 Summer Olympics in Amsterdam and a long-term member of the International Olympic Committee. Gratia reached sixth place at the world championships and won two major ski races, in St. Anton and Kitzbühel. She competed at the 1936 Winter Olympics in Garmisch-Partenkirchen, finishing 14th in the alpine combined event. Despite her two falls, this remains the highest ranking in Olympic skiing reached by a Dutch national.

After retiring, Schimmelpenninck van der Oye became the first female member of the board of the International Ski Federation. She was member of honour of the Dutch skiing federation and served as a skiing official at two Winter Olympics. Schimmelpenninck van der Oye died in Den Haag on Sunday 12 February 2012, age 99.

References

External links

Article with 1936 pictures (Dutch)

1912 births
2012 deaths
People from Doorn
Alpine skiers at the 1936 Winter Olympics
Dutch female alpine skiers
Baronesses of the Netherlands
Olympic alpine skiers of the Netherlands